Syllepte placophaea is a moth in the family Crambidae. It is found in Australia, where it has been recorded from Queensland.

References

Moths described in 1915
placophaea
Moths of Australia